Periglomerular cells mediate lateral inhibition in the olfactory system together with granule cells. They have inhibitory synapses on mitral cells and tufted cells.

References

Olfactory system
Neurons